GAA  is a Gaelic games highlights programme on Irish language-broadcaster TG4. The title of the programme changes each year to incorporate the year of broadcast.

Typically, it is shown on TG4 on Monday evenings from 20:00 and shows highlights of hurling and Gaelic football matches in the club championships, National Leagues, Fitzgibbon Cup and Sigerson Cup. During the summers months the programme is styled as Championship... and shows highlights of the provincial and All-Ireland Championships at minor, under-21 and senior levels.

References

2000s Irish television series
2010s Irish television series
Gaelic games on television
TG4 original programming